Dolnje Dobravice is a settlement north of Gradac in the Municipality of Metlika in the White Carniola area of southeastern Slovenia. The area is part of the traditional region of Lower Carniola and is now included in the Southeast Slovenia Statistical Region.

References

External links
 
Dolnje Dobravice on Geopedia

Populated places in the Municipality of Metlika